Marcel Claude Bessis (15 November 1917 – 28 March 1994) was a French physician known for research on blood cells.

Bessis was born in Tunis on 15 November 1917. He was educated at the Lycée Janson-de-Sailly in Paris, France. He developed an interest in microscopy in his teenage years and went on to study medicine at the University of Paris. During the Second World War, he served as a military physician and pioneered the technique of exchange transfusion to treat war injuries. He graduated with a medical degree in 1944. Later he studied exchange transfusion as a treatment for hemolytic disease of the newborn, uremia and acute leukemia. He was a frequent collaborator of Jean Bernard.

Bessis used electron microscopy and microcinematography to study the structure and function of blood cells—particularly red blood cells, but also platelets and white blood cells, including the abnormal cells found in leukemia.  He invented new instruments to aid his research and developed techniques for manipulating cells using laser microbeams. Maxwell Wintrobe credited Bessis with coining the terms stomatocyte, echinocyte and discocyte. Bessis wrote that "The doctor who knows how to see can recognize in a red cell the subtle alteration of a gene transmitted from time immemorial on the banks of the Congo River or the marks of aggressions of daily life. This form speaks a difficult language but one that can be entirely deciphered."

From 1946 to 1980, Bessis was editor-in-chief of the Nouvelle revue d'hématologie. He began working as a professor of hematology at the University of Paris in 1961, becoming full professor in 1972. Bessis was appointed editor-in-chief of Blood Cells in 1975, and from 1986 until his death in 1994 was a co-director of the Centre de recherches sur l'écologie des cellules du sang at the Hôpital de la Salpêtrière.

In 1967, Bessis was named a knight of the Legion d'Honneur. He was also a commander of the Ordre national du Mérite and an officer of the Ordre des Arts et des Lettres. He was an honorary president of the Société française d'hématologie.

Bessis married Claude Desserteaux in 1952; the couple raised three children. Bessis died in Paris on 28 March 1994.

Bibliography
Some of Bessis's published works include:

References

Recipients of the Legion of Honour
1994 deaths
20th-century French physicians
People from Tunis
Members of the French Academy of Sciences
University of Paris alumni
Academic staff of the University of Paris
Recipients of the Ordre des Arts et des Lettres
French hematologists
1917 births